State Route 781 (SR 781) is an east–west state highway in southern Ohio, a U.S. state.

Route description
All of SR 781 is located within the eastern portion of Adams County.  The highway is not inclusive within the National Highway System.

History
SR 781 was first designated in 1938 along the routing between SR 41 and SR 348 that it occupies to this day.  The route has not experienced any changes of major significance since it first appeared.

Major intersections

References

External links

781
Transportation in Adams County, Ohio